The Indian Empire Society was a London-based lobbying organization, formed in 1930 to promote the cause of the British Empire in India. 

The Society came into being at a meeting in July 1930 held in the Caxton Hall, London, at which the prime mover was Sir Michael O'Dwyer, a former Lieutenant Governor of the Punjab, following correspondence between the 4th Marquess of Salisbury and George Clarke, 1st Baron Sydenham of Combe.  Its activists were mostly former members of the Indian Civil Service and included several former provincial governors of British India, among them O'Dwyer, Lord Meston, and Sir Reginald Craddock. Its principal goal was to resist the policy of Indian constitutional reform which successive British governments of the 1930s had begun to pursue. 

Field Marshal Sir Claud Jacob, a former Commander-in-Chief, India, was chairman of the Society's Executive Committee.

The society's aims, and its membership, often overlapped with those of the India Defence League. The society frequently cited its deep concern for the fate of the Indian masses under a democratic system. A joint letter (written in 1933) sums up the society's attitude:

"As retired Government servants, with long experience of Indian conditions, we are convinced that a too rapid advance towards self-government would be fraught with the utmost danger, not only to British trade and commerce, but also to the security and happiness of the 350,000,000 of our Indian fellow-subjects." (published in the Times, 1933)

The society's first public meeting was held in Westminster in July 1930. The first president was Lord Sumner. Winston Churchill joined in October 1930 and made speeches to the society on a number of occasions.. Other prominent members included:

 Lord Ampthill, former governor of Madras
 Sir Hugh Barnes, former governor of Burma
 Sir Reginald Craddock, former governor of Burma
 Sir Mark Hunter, former official in Burma
 Sir Michael O'Dwyer, former lieutenant governor of Punjab
 Sir Charles Oman, historian
 Sir Louis Stuart, former chief judge of Oudh
 Lord Sydenham, former governor of Bombay
 Waris Ameer Ali, former district judge in the United Provinces of Agra and Oudh

Correspondence and papers of the Society from 1930 to 1948 are held in the Bodleian Library's Special Collections and Western Manuscripts section.

Notes

Political organisations based in England
Organizations established in 1930
Indian independence movement